WRHS is a commercial radio station licensed to Grasonville, Maryland, broadcasting mainly to the Annapolis / Anne Arundel County area and the Eastern Shore of Maryland on 103.1 FM. Owned by Peter & John Radio Fellowship, Inc., WRHS rebroadcasts the Contemporary Christian music of the co-owned WRBS-FM, which is branded on-air as Bright-FM. The station's transmitter is located in Grasonville/Queenstown, on Maryland's Eastern Shore of the Chesapeake Bay. It is a "Class A" radio station. WRHS mainly focuses on the Annapolis area, as well as the rest of Anne Arundel, Queen Anne's, and Talbot Counties, although the signal covers Baltimore, Annapolis, the eastern Washington, D.C., suburbs, and many other densely populated areas.

History

Early years (1979-1981)
WAQA signed on the air in 1979 and was founded by Edward Mason De Maso, as a hot adult contemporary/Top 40 station, known as Super Q103 with 3,000 watts from a tower at Kent Narrows, Maryland. The studio and tower were co-located.

Bay Country 103 (1981-1991)
In 1981, the call letters were changed to WBEY and the format changed to country. The station was known as Bay Country 103.

103.1 The Underground (1991-1992)
In early 1991, Vision Broadcasting purchased 103.1 and changed the call letters to WHVY and the format to active rock with an emphasis on heavy metal. The WHVY call letters and format were moved from low-power night-time-only non-commercial 96.7 in Baltimore (97 Underground) to 103.1. The studio was moved to Annapolis with a secondary studio maintained at the transmitter site.

Rock 103XZL (1992-1994)
In December 1992, the active rock format was tweaked some and the call letters were changed to WXZL. The station also increased its power to 6,000 watts from a new tower about 4 miles east of the original tower location.

103.1 WRNR (1994-2023)
The station changed its calls to WRNR-FM in 1994. Empire Broadcasting System acquired the station in 1997.

During this era, WRNR-FM's studios were located in Annapolis on Admiral Cochrane Drive. The official music format for WRNR-FM was adult album alternative, but the station added a lot to that format musically with deep tracks of classic rock, new alternative rock, vintage alternative rock, reggae, roots rock, and more. They are credited as one of the radio stations that helped launch the bands "Wilco" and many others. WRNR-FM was one of the few independent radio stations in the Baltimore-Washington area.

On November 4, 2022, Empire announced it would sell WRNR-FM to Peter and John Ministries, the owners of Christian AC station WRBS-FM (known on air as Bright FM) and Christian talk station WRBS. Included in the sale was the station's frequency, its licenses, and most of its broadcasting equipment; excluded from the sale was the station's call sign, its format and IP, and its Annapolis studio, all of which station owner Steve Kingston claimed was to be moved to another frequency, with WSMD-FM's frequency already in mind. WRNR-FM's programming remained on the frequency until February 10, 2023, being replaced with messages encouraging listeners to download its app and listen on their website before Bright-FM took over. The sale was also consummated on February 10, at a price of $1.54 million. Peter and John took over all broadcast operations of the station the following day. As of February 11, 2023, WRNR-FM programming is being broadcast online, as well as on former repeater WYRE. The broadcast/webcast plays a top of the hour legal ID that says, "The Voice of the Bay, WYRE, Annapolis and WRNR Online" with occasional "103.1 RNR" spot announcements in between songs.

Bright-FM (2023-present)
Bright-FM programming arrived on WRNR-FM on February 11, 2023, with the station serving as a simulcast of WRBS-FM for the Eastern Shore of Maryland and Baltimore's northeast suburbs.
The main Bright-FM studios are located in Commerce Drive near Interstate 95 in Halethorpe, Maryland, using a Baltimore address. On February 16, 2023, the station changed its call sign to WRHS.

References

External links
 

Annapolis, Maryland
RHS
RHS
Contemporary Christian radio stations in the United States
Radio stations established in 1980
1980 establishments in Maryland